Tim Albin (born September 13, 1965) is an American college football coach and former player. He is the head football coach at Ohio University, a position he has held since the 2021 season. He served as the head football coach at Northwestern Oklahoma State from 1997 through 1999. He led the 1999 Northwestern Oklahoma State Rangers football team to an undefeated 13–0 record, with the season culminating in a NAIA National Championship.

In 2009, he was inducted to the Northwestern Oklahoma State Athletic Hall of Fame for his contributions in the sport of football.

Playing career
Albin played wide receiver for Northwestern Oklahoma State from 1985 through 1988, while completing his degree in business administration. He earned first-team All-Oklahoma Intercollegiate Conference honors, and was also the first player in the school history to be named All-District IX three times. Albin compiled 109 receptions for 1,811 yards in his career.

Coaching career

Northeastern State
Following his playing career, Albin joined the coaching staff at Northeastern State as a graduate assistant coaching the wide receivers from 1989 to 1991, while also completing his master's of science degree. In 1992, he was promoted to offensive coordinator and offensive line coach. He served in that role for two years.

Return to Northwestern Oklahoma State
In 1994, Albin returned to his alma mater at Northwestern Oklahoma State serving as the offensive coordinator and offensive line coach for three seasons. In 1997, Albin was promoted to head coach, a position he held for three seasons. Albin's teams improved every year going 5–5 in 1997, 7–3 in 1998, and then 13–0 in 1999. In 1999, Albin's Rangers won the NAIA Football National Championship. Albin was named the NAIA Coach of the Year by Rawlings and American Football Coach Magazine. At Northwestern Oklahoma State, Albin coached longtime NFL WR Patrick Crayton, TE Brandon Christenson, DB Lynn Scott, and 2000 NFL Draft pick DT Ron Moore.

Nebraska
In 2000, Albin joined Frank Solich's staff at Nebraska as an offensive graduate assistant, working with the tight ends for three seasons. He helped coach Tracey Wistrom, who earned third team All-America honors in back-to-back seasons and was selected in the 2002 NFL Draft.
In 2003, Albin was promoted to running back coach and pass game coordinator. After Solich's dismissal, Albin was not retained. Albin coached NFL players Cory Ross, Tierre Green, and Steve Kriewald.

North Dakota State
Albin spent the 2004 season as the offensive coordinator and running backs coach at North Dakota State. He helped guide the Bison to an 8–3 season, and No. 25 national ranking in their first season in NCAA Division I-AA (now known as FCS). From the offense, OL Rob Hunt was selected in the 2005 NFL Draft.

Ohio
In 2005, Albin rejoined Solich at Ohio when Solich was named head coach. Albin was the offensive coordinator and running backs coach from his arrival in Athens through the 2020 season. Albin's offenses have been prolific during his time at Ohio. At the running back position, he coached former NFL players Kalvin McRae and Beau Blankenship, as well as current CFL players A.J. Ouellette, Maleek Irons, and Papi White. On the offense that he led, there were several NFL Draft picks (WR Taylor Price, WR LaVon Brazill, OL Eric Herman), several undrafted NFL players (WR Phil Bates, TE Jordan Thompson, WR Donte Foster, TE Troy Mangen, and OL Joe Lowery), and CFL Draft picks QB Nathan Rourke and RB Maleek Irons.

Albin was named the 2018 FootballScoop Running Backs coach of the year.

While continuing as the offensive coordinator, Albin was promoted to associate head coach on February 28, 2019, following Jim Burrow's retirement.

On July 14, 2021 Albin was promoted to Head Coach at Ohio following the unexpected retirement of Solich prior to the 2021 season. In his first season the Bobcats finished 3–5 in the MAC to finish in third place in the East Division. They went 0–4 in non-conference games including a loss to FCS Duquesne. This was Ohio's first losing season since 2008. The 2022 season marked a big turnaround from 2021. They finished the regular season on a seven game winning streak with a 9–3 record and 7–1 mark in the MAC. They won the MAC East for the first time since 2016. but lost to Toledo in the MAC Championship Game. Ohio defeated Wyoming in the Arizona Bowl

Personal life
Albin and his wife, Brooke, have a daughter, Tori, and a son, Treyce.

Head coaching record

References

External links
 Ohio profile

1965 births
Living people
American football wide receivers
Nebraska Cornhuskers football coaches
North Dakota State Bison football coaches
Northeastern State RiverHawks football coaches
Northwestern Oklahoma State Rangers football players
Ohio Bobcats football coaches
People from Woodward, Oklahoma